The 2006 Hart Council election took place on 4 May 2006 to elect members of Hart District Council in Hampshire, England. One third of the council was up for election and the council stayed under no overall control.

After the election, the composition of the council was:
Conservative 16
Liberal Democrat 12
Community Campaign (Hart) 5
Independent 2

Election result
The results saw 2 seats change hands with the Community Campaign (Hart) (CCH) group winning them both. One gain saw the Conservatives lose the seat of Church Crookham East, which Peter Hutcheson had held for the Conservatives for over 20 years, to the CCH. The other gain saw the CCH win Crondall by 2 votes over the Conservatives, gaining the seat which had formerly been held by Independent Norman Lambert. Lambert had resigned from the Conservative group in 2005 after admitting making false claims for council tax and housing benefit. The changes meant that the Conservatives remained the largest party on the council with 16 seats but were vulnerable to a coalition among the other groups. Overall turnout in the election was 39.35%.

Following the election the Conservative administration of the council, which had run the council for the previous 8 years, was voted out. They were replaced by a new Coalition Political Group, which was formed by the 12 Liberal Democrats, 5 Community Campaign (Hart) councillors and 1 of the 2 Independents, Denis Gotel. The leader of the Liberal Democrat group on the council, David Neighbour, became leader of the new group and the new leader of the council.

Ward results

Church Crookham East

Church Crookham West

Crondall

Fleet Central

Fleet North

Fleet Pondtail

Fleet West

Frogmore and Darby Green

Hartley Wintney

Hook

Long Sutton

Yateley North

References

2006
2006 English local elections
2000s in Hampshire